Three ships of the Imperial German Navy have been named SMS Cyclop:

 : gunboat, launched 1860
 : dock ship, launched 1916

German Navy ship names